Noémi Pásztor (born 2 April 1999) is a Hungarian handballer for Mosonmagyaróvári KC SE and the Hungarian national team.

She made her international debut on 5 June 2019 against Austria.

Achievements
Junior World Championship: 
Gold Medalist: 2018
Youth European Championship: 
Bronze Medalist: 2015

Awards and recognition
 All-Star Pivot of the Youth European Championship: 2015  
 All-Star Pivot of the Junior World Championship: 2018

Personal life
In 2021 she graduated from the Semmelweis University and earned a degree in dietetics.

References

External links

1999 births
Living people
Sportspeople from Szombathely
Hungarian female handball players
Ferencvárosi TC players (women's handball)